Tina Šetkić (born 7 April 1999) is a French guitarist specialising in covering solos of heavy metal from Van Halen, Gary Moore, Iron Maiden, Megadeth, and Pink Floyd, and metalised classical music including  pieces from  Beethoven, Paganini, and Vivaldi. Her YouTube videos attracted the attention of musicians and guitar manufacturers.

Early life

Originally from the Paris region, she received classical guitar lessons at the age of 6, and later studied under jazz-rock guitarist Renaud Louis-Servais. At the age of 9, she covered the classic version of "Hotel California" by the Eagles and at 13 she began to specialise in electric rock.

According to Šetkić, her interest in the guitar stems from her passion for the work of female guitarists Ana Vidović and Orianthi.

YouTube

Šetkić started a YouTube channel in 2007 (at age 8) and in 2013 uploaded a video of her cover of Eddie Van Halen's guitar solo Eruption. Within a week, this video was seen four million times and in the following two years had been watched eleven million times.

In the same year, she took up Antonio Vivaldi's third movement, "Presto", from the Concerto No. 2 in G minor, op. 8, RV 315, better known as the Summer of Four Seasons (the piece was adapted for the electric guitar by Patrick Rondat in 1996). In March 2015, she played Through the Fire and Flames, by the British band  DragonForce.

By early 2016, her videos had received a total of about sixty million visits. and in  2017 she rated #217 (Top 36%) on the list of French YouTubers based on the number of subscribers and rated #265 (Top 44%) on the list of French YouTubers based on  the number of YouTube hits. Šetkić became a featured artist of the French guitar manufacturer Vigier Guitars, and her playing has been noticed by bassist Wolfgang Van Halen.

Šetkić has not uploaded any videos since late 2016 but by 2020 she had amassed a total of 162 million views.

References

External links

1999 births
Living people
French heavy metal guitarists
21st-century French women musicians
21st-century guitarists
21st-century women guitarists